is a railway station on the Takayama Main Line in the town of Shirakawa, Kamo District, Gifu Prefecture, Japan, operated by Central Japan Railway Company (JR Central).

Lines

Station layout
Shimoyui Station has two ground-level opposed side platforms connected by a footbridge. The station is unattended.

Platforms

Adjacent stations

History
Shimoyui Station opened on March 21, 1928. The station was absorbed into the JR Central network upon the privatization of Japanese National Railways (JNR) on April 1, 1987.

Surrounding area
Hida River

See also

 List of Railway Stations in Japan

Railway stations in Gifu Prefecture
Takayama Main Line
Railway stations in Japan opened in 1928
Stations of Central Japan Railway Company
Shirakawa, Gifu (town)